Huỳnh Sanh Thông (Saigon, July 15, 1926 – November 15, 2008) was a Vietnamese American scholar and translator.

Life

He was born to a rice-miller mother (Lâm Thị Kén) and a Francophile primary schoolteacher father (Huỳnh Sanh Thinh) in Hóc Môn, close to Sài Gòn (now Ho Chi Minh City). When the family moved into Sài Gòn itself, Thông enrolled at the prestigious Lycée Petrus Trương Vĩnh Ký where he studied French literature, specializing particularly in the works of Molière and La Fontaine.

In 1945, he joined the clandestine Vietnamese independence movement, opposed to the post-war re-establishment of French colonial rule in Vietnam. The following year, while working as a janitor at the US consulate, he was arrested by the French and held in a concentration camp outside Sài Gòn. Diplomatic pressure from the Americans resulted in his release, whereupon he fled to the United States as a political refugee, arriving in Athens, Ohio in 1948.

He graduated in Economics at Ohio University in 1951, but was particularly interested in the issue of gender inequality, which he saw as a serious problem both in the US and in his native Vietnam. As he put it in 2008: "I looked for a way to
explain the difference between how responsible women and irresponsible
men were treated in society, as in my own family as well as in many others I could see."

He studied international relations and anthropology at the Universities of Georgetown and Cornell before starting work with Robert B. Jones on a Vietnamese primer that was eventually published as An Introduction to Spoken Vietnamese (1960).

For the month of May 1957, Thông was appointed by the US government as the official "Vietnamese welcomer" to Ngo Dinh Diem. Later that same year, he joined the staff of Yale University as a teacher of Vietnamese. He would remain associated with Yale for the rest of his life.

He passed away from causes of sudden heart failure on November 17, 2008 at 82 years old.

Works and awards

Thông is best known for his English translation of Nguyễn Du's Kim Vân Kiều, published as The Tale of Kiều (Yale University Press, 1973, reissued several times), and for An Anthology of Vietnamese Poems: From the Eleventh through the Twentieth Centuries (Yale).

His translation of Flowers from Hell by the Vietnamese dissident poet Nguyễn Chí Thiện won the 1985 prize at the Poetry International Festival in Rotterdam.

He also founded the Lac-Viet book series, publishing work by Vietnam scholars such as O. W. Wolters; and the journal Vietnam Forum  (16 issues, 1983–1997).

In 1999, he self-published The Golden Serpent: How Humans Learned to Speak and Invent Culture.

He was awarded the Harry J. Benda Prize in Southeast Asia Studies in 1981, and a MacArthur "Genius" Award in 1987.

References

External links
Lac-Viet Book Series
Vietnam Forum  at Yale University Press

1926 births
2008 deaths
Vietnamese emigrants to the United States
Vietnamese writers
Vietnamese translators
Ohio University alumni
Yale University alumni
MacArthur Fellows
20th-century translators